NBC broadcast the Rose Bowl beginning in 1952 until the 1988 Rose Bowl when ABC took over. It had the Orange Bowl from 1965 through 1995. (The 1971 contest was the very last sporting event on US television to carry cigarette ads.) NBC also aired the Gator Bowl in 1949 and again from 1969 through 1971 and 1996 through 2006, the Sugar Bowl from 1958 through 1969, the Sun Bowl in 1964 and again in 1966, the Fiesta Bowl from 1978 through 1995, the Citrus Bowl from 1984 through 1985, the Hall of Fame Bowl from 1988 through 1992, and the Cotton Bowl from 1993 to 1995.

List of broadcasters

Citrus Bowl

Cotton Bowl

Fiesta Bowl

The Fiesta Bowl began in 1971, but was considered a “minor bowl” until the January 1, 1982 game between Penn State–USC. Since then, the Fiesta Bowl has been considered a major bowl.

Gator Bowl

Hall of Fame Bowl

Orange Bowl

Rose Bowl

The 1952 Rose Bowl, on NBC, was the first national telecast of a college football game. The network broadcast both the Tournament of Roses Parade and the following game.

Sugar Bowl

Sun Bowl

See also
College football on television
NFL on NBC
NFL on NBC announcers
NBC College Football Game of the Week
Notre Dame Football on NBC

References

External links
Fiesta Bowl Numbers Game
Orange Bowl Numbers Game - Sports Media Watch
Rose Bowl Numbers Game
Our History | NBC Sports
All-Time Television Appearances - University of Texas Athletics
Georgia Football TV Appearances - University of Georgia
NBCSN to air nightly programming from NBC Sports’ vault of historic games, beginning April 27
Key Moments in Outback Bowl History
1990's Game History - TaxSlayer Gator Bowl

College bowl game broadcasts
Lists of college football bowl broadcasters
College bowl game broadcasts
College bowl game broadcasts
Sports telecast series
College football television series